Christopher Jon Largen (June 18, 1969 – December 22, 2012) was a United States award-winning journalist, novelist, social satirist, public speaker and filmmaker, known for his iconoclastic writings on health and public policy, and his efforts to reduce child abuse. Largen's work is featured in hundreds of news outlets and literary journals, including: Village Voice, Fort Worth Star-Telegram, Nashville Scene, The Hill, Lone Star Iconoclast, Creative Loafing, Fort Worth Weekly, LA Weekly, and a syndicated column for The Washington Post. He died of a heart attack in December 2012 at the age of 43.

Early years
Christopher Jon Largen was born at Harris Methodist Hospital in Fort Worth, Tarrant County, Texas to parents Robert and Karen Largen. Christopher's mother was only seventeen years old at the time of his birth, and both of them almost died during labor.

Family doctors later suggested that Largen's traumatic birth may have contributed to Largen's severe hyperactive behaviors, for which he was diagnosed at the age of five. Despite the disorder, Largen was recognized as a gifted child, and skipped a portion of first grade.

Due to his father's advertising career, Largen grew up in several cities throughout the United States, including Austin, Houston, Des Moines, Chicago, St. Louis, New York City, and Dallas. Absorbing cultural variety and adjusting to constant change, Largen would later recount that he struggled with a vague sense of being a perpetual outsider, a theme that would later influence his creative work.

Theatre Arts
At the age of eight, Largen became a professional stage singer, actor, dancer and model. Signing with Kim Dawson Agency, he performed in professional and community theatres in Chicago, Fort Worth, and St. Louis, playing lead and supporting roles in Our Hearts Were Young and Gay, Interview, Sleeping Beauty, The King and I, South Pacific, You're a Good Man, Charlie Brown, The Innocents, Happy Birthday, Wanda June, Oliver!, and The Mousetrap. Largen worked with notable stage actors like Ruta Lee, Debbie Reynolds, and Jerry Russell. He also fulfilled contracts in runway and catalogue modeling, and a television commercial for amusement park Old Chicago, where director Brian De Palma filmed scenes from his 1978 film The Fury. He studied theater at Creative Arts Theater School in Chicago, and pursued Ballet at Barbara Wood Dance Studio in Fort Worth.

Largen attended Professional Youth Conservatory in Fort Worth, Texas, a now-defunct private performing arts high school located in the attic of the Methodist church on the campus of Texas Wesleyan University. While at PYC, Largen studied Drama, Dance, Voice, Mime, and Playwriting, taking classes with other professional performers including Grammy award-winning gospel singer Kirk Franklin. Through self-paced study he received his four-year diploma in two years, and was honored with the Outstanding Student of the Year award in 1987. He was subsequently awarded a full drama scholarship at Texas Wesleyan University, which he declined in order to pursue interdisciplinary humanities studies at University of North Texas in Denton.

Journalism
Largen's literary debut was a 2001 front cover feature article for Village Voice, which previously published writers including Ezra Pound, Henry Miller, Katherine Anne Porter, James Baldwin, E.E. Cummings, and Allen Ginsberg. The article was an investigative biographical report on the United States Government's little-known medical cannabis program, a subject which federal officials had remained silent about for decades.

Subsequently, Largen was featured in hundreds of print and online news and literary outlets in the United States, Canada, the United Kingdom, Netherlands, and Germany. Many of his articles focused on the relationship between health and public policy, with a creative and personal perspective in the tradition of Gonzo journalism.

A supporter of decentralized reporting, Largen developed an extensive social profile network of approximately 60,000 readers, through which he blogged and disseminated news stories neglected in corporate media outlets.

Caregiving
Before and since becoming a writer, Largen devoted several years as a personal caregiver and care manager for people with physical, psychiatric, and developmental disabilities, in a variety of private and public residential and institutional settings. He also worked in geriatrics and hospice care, and served as a counselor for emotionally disturbed children who were survivors of physical and sexual abuse.

In 2010 Largen received his interdisciplinary Bachelor of Applied Arts and Sciences degree in Psychology, Sociology, and Rehabilitation, from University of North Texas.

Prescription Pot
In 2003 Largen co-authored the nonfiction book Prescription Pot with George McMahon. McMahon is a former Vice-Presidential candidate, recipient of the National Certificate of Heroism, and legal user of medical Cannabis from the United States Government's Compassionate Investigational New Drug program. McMahon used the government Cannabis to treat pain, spasms and nausea related to repeated injuries, surgical and pharmaceutical maltreatment, and a rare genetic condition called Nail Patella Syndrome, which causes bone deformities, immune system dysfunction, and a propensity for renal failure.

During the authoring of Prescription Pot, Largen traveled the United States with McMahon, documenting the latter's efforts to educate doctors and legislators about the therapeutic value of the Cannabis plant. The book details one of their journeys through Texas, to the Arkansas State capitol building in Little Rock, to Elvis Presley's Graceland, culminating in their arrival at the University of Mississippi, where the U.S. Government grows marijuana for the federal cannabis program. Their journeys inspired articles in news outlets with an aggregate circulation in the tens of millions, and the book received positive reviews in a wide spectrum of international print and online venues.

Largen became a sought-after public speaker, serving as guest faculty at colleges and conferences across the U.S. Largen appeared on stage with a wide array of artists, musicians, politicians, professional athletes, and renowned scientists, including talk show host Montel Williams, funk icon George Clinton, former NFL lineman and two-time Super Bowl champion Mark Stepnoski, former Tribal President of the Oglala Sioux Alex White Plume, Kentucky Governor candidate Gatewood Galbraith, acclaimed medical researcher Raphael Mechoulam and Spoonfed Tribe.

Junk
In 2005 Largen authored the dystopian satirical novel  Junk, published by ENC Press, about a fictional war on junk food declared in response to obesity-related illness and death. Junk satirized a wide spectrum of issues, including religion, government, political correctness, organized crime, and the media.

Largen edited Junk with publisher and author Olga Gardner Galvin, who edited works by best-selling writers Michael Crichton, Ursula K. Le Guin, Dennis Miller, Terry Pratchett, and Harlan Ellison.

Junk received the Blog Critics award for Top Ten Books of the Year, and garnered positive reviews in alternative and college newspapers throughout the country, with some critics comparing Largen's novel to Mark Twain and Kurt Vonnegut.

In 2008 Largen adapted Junk to screenplay.

Building-BLOCK
An outspoken survivor of traumatic violence in his childhood, Largen is a founder of Building-BLOCK (Better Lives for Our Communities and Kids), a national nonprofit organization dedicated to reducing and preventing child abuse, improving public safety, and exposing legal injustices and sentencing disparities.

During his efforts to establish Building-BLOCK, Largen interviewed and befriended Mark Lunsford, the father of abducted and murdered Jessica Lunsford and outspoken advocate for Jessica's Law. Largen publicly advocates for longer prison sentences for child predators, closer monitoring of paroled pedophiles and violent felons, and greater prioritization of victim rights.

The Washington Post featured Building-BLOCK in a syndicated column written by Neal Peirce, and it appeared in multiple U.S. newspapers, including the Lone Star Iconoclast.

Bohemia Rising: The Story of Fry Street
In 2007, Largen produced and directed The Burning of Fry Street, an award-winning documentary about an arts community protest that evolves into arson and economic terrorism.

In May 2006, the 100-block of Fry Street in Largen's hometown of Denton, Texas was purchased by United Equities, a Houston-based real estate company, which announced that several of the historic buildings would be demolished to accommodate a corporate strip center. A grass roots effort by the non-profit organization Save Fry Street was unsuccessful in preventing the development.

In June 2007, Largen arrived on Fry Street, hoping to obtain demolition process shots, when he discovered that activists had seized the gutted building that housed The Tomato Pizza. Largen decided to stay and keep filming, conducting interviews with dozens of people, including James Taylor Moseley, a local activist and musician who chained himself to The Tomato for three days.

Largen captured the building on video while it burned in a raging arson fire on June 27, 2007. Afterwards, Denton arson investigators acquired Largen's camera, and his video footage was used as crime evidence to obtain a warrant for Moseley, who was arrested and accused of setting the fire. Largen's footage was also utilized by Moseley's attorney to build a defense. The footage was thus considered both incriminating and exonerating.

During the investigation, detectives turned up evidence of an incendiary device placed in the burned building, set to detonate several hours after the arson blaze. Police searched the home of one of the activists (not Moseley) who reportedly had a background working with demolition technology, but they could not find enough physical evidence to get an arrest warrant for the activist.

Once Largen's camera was returned to him, he entered the editing studio and focused on transforming three days of footage into a cohesive film. In the meantime, local activists toppled construction fences and scattered bluebonnet seeds on the scorched Fry Street property, hoping to force United Equities to seek special permission to bulldoze the state flower of Texas.

The completed film, The Burning of Fry Street, won the Jury Award for Best Documentary Short at Thin Line Film Festival. During the festival, a mysterious firebomb was set to blow up the festival headquarters, almost killing several people and destroying the raw footage from the film. Arson investigators believed the perpetrator(s) may have been angered by the release of The Burning of Fry Street. Denton Record-Chronicle did not report the incident, for fear of inspiring "copycat" attacks.

The Burning of Fry Street received critical acclaim among underground film aficionados, and is included in the extensive 2008 DVD compilation, Bohemia Rising: The Story of Fry Street. The compilation chronicles the weeklong demonstrations, arson of The Tomato Pizza and aftermath, and includes the live music video ("The Denton Polka") Largen directed for the Grammy award-winning ensemble, Brave Combo.

As of today's date, nobody was ever indicted or formally charged with the arson blaze that consumed The Tomato Pizza. The crime remains unsolved.

Baristas Against Drunk Driving (BADD)

In November 2009 Largen founded Baristas Against Drunk Driving, an organization dedicated to giving bar customers a viable alternative to drinking and driving. Based in Denton, Texas, BADD was forged as a local partnership between Fry Street district bars and Big Mike's Coffee Shop, which provided discount "After-Hours Happy Hour" coffee coupons to intoxicated patrons. The coupons included contact information for taxi and safe ride services, and encouraged drinkers to sober up before getting behind the wheel. Within the first year of its inception, BADD garnered national trade journal coverage, and the partnership expanded to include restaurants, universities, and fraternities/sororities. Journalists deemed BADD an asset: coffee shops drew customers and generated revenue, bars gained a layer of liability protection in the event of damages related to the actions of their customers, and the public enjoyed safer streets.

Quotes
"Birth is an experience that proves life is not merely function and utility, but form and beauty."
"I'm a fundamentalistic agnostic. That means I don't know, but I KNOW I don't know, and YOU don't know either. I have faith, but faith is not knowledge."
"If coffee was outlawed and sold by cocaine dealers, a cup of java would become a gateway mug."
"Just how exactly does a violent predator get convicted of raping a four year-old child, yet receive not a single day in jail, in the most incarcerated nation per capita on earth?"
"There's a new low-fat communion wafer on the market. It's called, I Can't Believe It's Not Jesus."

Bibliography
Prescription Pot: A Leading Advocate's Heroic Battle to Legalize Medical Marijuana (New Horizon Press, 2003)
Junk (ENC Press, 2005)
Opposing Viewpoints: Marijuana (2005)

Filmography
Quincy Jones: Grace (1987)
The Burning of Fry Street (2007)
Brave Combo: The Denton Polka Live at Dan's Silverleaf (2007)
A Driving Peace (2008)
Bohemia Rising: The Story of Fry Street (2009)

References

External links
Denton Record-Chronicle: BADD Idea Proactive
Dallas Morning News: A Little Time to Clear the Head
 Bohemia Rising: The Story of Fry Street - Official Website for the DVD
 Building-BLOCK - Official Site
 War On Junk - Official Site for the novel Junk
National Academy of Public Administration Article on Building-Block
 Village Voice cover feature - "Kind Bud" by Christopher Largen
 Fort Worth Weekly: Prescription Pot Review
 Creative Loafing Atlanta - Junk review
 Denton Record Chronicle - "Filmmaker to Release a Collection of Short Films on Fry Street District"
 The Daily Maine "Holistic Health: A Book Review"
 Texas Cable News - "Thin Line Film Festival Announces Winners"
 Philadelphia City Paper - "A Blunt Lesson"
 The Writing Show Podcast with Christopher Largen: Writing Satire
 Seattle Times - "Targeting Child Molesters"

1969 births
2012 deaths
Novelists from Texas
20th-century American novelists
21st-century American novelists
American male novelists
20th-century American male writers
21st-century American male writers